The Nangpa La shooting incident occurred on 30 September 2006 when a group of unarmed Tibetan refugees attempting to flee Tibet via the Nangpa La pass were fired upon by Chinese border guards. The shooting resulted in at least one death and numerous injuries. The victims were shot from a distance by border guards as they moved slowly through chest-deep snow. Although the Chinese government initially denied the shooting, the death of one of the refugees was captured on film by a Slovenian cameraman who was nearby as part of a climbing expedition. The video caused expressions of anger from around the world. 

Forty-one members of the Tibetan group reached India, while the other thirty-two living members were taken into custody by Chinese border guards. Most of the refugees were later released, although some are still unaccounted for.  Some of the individuals who were released stated that they suffered torture and forced hard labor during their captivity.

The incident
On 30 September 2006, a group of 75 Tibetans, accompanied by two guides, crossed the Chinese border to join the Dalai Lama in exile in Dharamsala, India.  At approximately 10:30 a.m. local time, Chinese border guards of the People's Armed Police opened fire on the group. The gunfire resulted in the death of Kelsang Namtso, a 17-year-old Buddhist nun.  Kunsang Namgyal, a 23-year-old man, was hit in the leg twice, then taken away by the Chinese border guard. Even though the group was not armed, the Chinese initially claimed that their soldiers fired in self-defense. Forty-one of the refugees, along with the guides, reached the Tibetan Refugee Transit Center in Kathmandu, Nepal. Two weeks later they arrived at their destination in Dharamsala, India.

Nangpa La Pass is visible from the nearby Cho Oyu mountain and its mountaineering base camps. Dozens of foreign mountaineers who were on Cho Oyu witnessed the incident. The mountaineers were able to produce numerous images and videos of the incident, including images of Chinese soldiers escorting the survivors through advanced base camp at Cho Oyu and footage of the People's Armed Police personnel shooting the refugees from great distance. Sergiu Matei, a cameraman at Pro TV, filmed the incident and broadcast live during the incident on Romanian station Pro FM. Matei also helped hide one of the Tibetan refugees for 10 hours before the refugee was able to cross the border into Nepal.

Aftermath

On 12 October 2006, the official Chinese news agency, Xinhua, reported that the border guards had been "forced to defend themselves" after the refugees had thrown stones at them while trying to cross the border.

Matei successfully smuggled his footage of the shooting out of the country. On 14 October 2006, Matei was interviewed on the Romanian television station Pro TV. Footage of the incident was shown during the interview.

Chinese authorities initially denied that Kelsang Namtso, a 17-year-old Buddhist nun, had been killed during the 30 September shooting, saying instead that she had been captured and later died in a hospital due to "lack of oxygen." On 23 October 2006, after the release of the footage showing Namtso being shot, the Chinese authorities changed their account. They confirmed that Namtso had been killed by gunfire during the 30 September shooting.

The incident received global media attention concerning the issues of the Chinese occupation of Tibet and human rights violations in Tibet. On 12 October 2006, the United States Ambassador to China, Clark T. Randt, lodged a formal protest regarding China's treatment of the refugees. On 26 October 2006, the European Union Parliament passed a Joint Motion for a Resolution on Tibet, making explicit reference to the shooting.

On 30 November 2006 at the meeting of the UN Human Rights Council in Geneva, Switzerland, 16 non-governmental organizations issued a joint statement questioning the UN High Commissioner for Human Rights on the steps taken concerning the 30 September killing of a Tibetan in the Nangpa Pass. However, the High Commissioner did not respond to questions posed about the Nangpa Pass killing.

Missing persons

Of the 75 refugees who attempted to cross the border on 30 September 2006, 17 people remain unaccounted for. At least one individual captured by the Chinese government was released, but said that he had been tortured and subjected to mandatory hard labor. The individuals who were not accounted for ranged in age from 7 to 35 years old. Some of the children who are unaccounted for may have been detained for a short time and then released.

Portrayal in the arts
A documentary called Tibet: Murder in the Snow, based on this incident, was released in 2008 by the Australian production company 360 Degree Films, working in collaboration with the BBC.

English journalist Jonathan Green wrote a book about the shootings, titled Murder in the High Himalayas, which was released in 2010. The book is an expansion of Green's earlier article in Men's Journal called "Murder at 19,000 Feet." Canadian technical death metal band Gorguts' song "Absconders" on their album Colored Sands was based on Green's book, using direct quotes from the book with Green's permission.

See also
Human rights in Tibet
Tibetan Government in Exile
Nangpa La
Pavle Kozjek, Slovenian mountaineer and photographer of the Nangpa La killing

Sources
References

Further reading
Jonathan Green. Murder in the High Himalaya. PublicAffairs, 2010.  - a book-length account of the incident.

External links
 Nangpa la Killings: A Matter of Routine? Phayul 23 October 2006
 Tibet: Murder in the Snow. Top Documentary Films. Retrieved 10 April 2010.
 Nangpa La Shooting – an eyewitness account Phayul 10 October 2006
 China tries to gag climbers who saw Tibet killings  The Independent 11 October 2006
 Nangpa La shooting survivors head for India Phayul 21 October 2006
 Second Tibetan shot at border Phayul 24 October 2006
 "China: Interview with Two Survivors of the Nangpa Pass Shooting" Human Rights
 "UN Human Rights Chief Questioned on Nangpa Pass Killings" Phayul.com 30 November 2006

2006 in Tibet
People shot dead by law enforcement officers
Tibetan independence movement
Human rights abuses in China